Robert Ledbetter (September 24, 1933 – October 7, 1983) was an American football player and coach. He served as the head football coach at Norfolk State University from 1972 to 1973, compiling a record of 8–12.

Head coaching record

References

1933 births
1983 deaths
New Orleans Saints coaches
New York Giants coaches
New York Jets coaches
Norfolk State Spartans football coaches
Southern Illinois Salukis football coaches
People from Tupelo, Mississippi
Players of American football from Mississippi